Songs is a solo album by American jazz pianist Matthew Shipp performing popular standards and spirituals, which was recorded in 2001 and released on the Italian Splasc(H) label. Its "We Free Kings" track is a Roland Kirk composition based on the Christmas carol "We Three Kings".

Reception

In his review for AllMusic, Steve Loewy states "The interpretations are original, disturbing at times, but also uplifting and lyrical. The pianist follows a strategy of laying down a melody and slowly deconstructing the piece, but what is remarkable is the way in which he never lets go of the underlying song even at the most extreme moments."

Track listing
 "We Free Kings" (John Henry Hopkins, Jr.) – 4:16
 "There Will Never Be Another You" (Harry Warren / Mack Gordon) – 5:42
 "Almighty Fortress Is Our God" (Martin Luther) – 5:01
 "Con Alma" (Dizzy Gillespie) – 8:16
 "Angel Eyes" (Matt Dennis / Earl Brent)– 5:35
 "On Green Dolphin Street" (Bronislav Kaper / Ned Washington) – 3:53
 "Bags' Groove" (Milt Jackson) – 3:25
 "Yesterdays" (Jerome Kern / Otto Harbach) – 5:32
 "East Broadway Run Down" (Sonny Rollins) – 5:17

Personnel
Matthew Shipp - piano

References

2002 albums
Matthew Shipp albums
Solo piano jazz albums